Maxine Gates (May 3, 1917 – July 27, 1990) was an American actress.

Gates was born in Hebron, Nebraska.

She appeared in over 35 films between 1945 and 1972. Due to her rotund figure (reportedly, Gates weighed 250 pounds), Gates was often cast as a love interest who often intimidated her husband or boyfriend. She is best known for her appearances in several 1950s-era Three Stooges films such as Goof on the Roof, Husbands Beware and Muscle Up a Little Closer.

During World War II, Gates performed in night clubs and stage shows and was acclaimed for her singing and dancing. In the course of these performances, Gates kissed male audience members on the cheek, and kissed 7,000 men in seven months.

After retiring from acting in 1972, Gates ran a self storage business in Van Nuys, California. She died of complications from respiratory disease in Panorama City on July 27, 1990 at the age of 73.

Filmography

References

External links

1917 births
1990 deaths
Actresses from Nebraska
American film actresses
American television actresses
20th-century American actresses
People from Hebron, Nebraska